The men's snowboard cross competition of the 2018 Winter Olympics was held on 15 February 2018 
Bogwang Phoenix Park in Pyeongchang, South Korea.

In the victory ceremony, the medals were presented by James Tomkins, member of the International Olympic Committee, accompanied by Dean Gosper, FIS council member.

Qualification

The top 40 athletes in the Olympic quota allocation list qualified, with a maximum of four athletes per National Olympic Committee (NOC) allowed. All athletes qualifying must also have placed in the top 30 of a FIS World Cup event or the FIS Freestyle Ski and Snowboarding World Championships 2017 during the qualification period (July 1, 2016 to January 21, 2018) and also have a minimum of 100 FIS points to compete. If the host country, South Korea at the 2018 Winter Olympics did not qualify, their chosen athlete would displace the last qualified athlete, granted all qualification criterion was met.

Results

Seeding
The seeding run was held at 11:00.

Elimination round
The top three finishers from each heat advance to the next round. In the semifinals the first three ranked competitors of each heat proceed to the Big Final. The 4th to 6th ranked competitors of each heat proceed to the Small Final.

1/8 round

Heat 1

Heat 2

Heat 3

Heat 4

Heat 5

Heat 6

Heat 7

Heat 8

Quarterfinals

Heat 1

Heat 2

Heat 3

Heat 4

Semifinals

Semifinal 1

Semifinal 2

Finals
Small final

Big final

References

Men's snowboarding at the 2018 Winter Olympics